Macenta is a prefecture located in the Nzérékoré Region of Guinea. The capital is Macenta. The prefecture covers an area of 7,056 km.² and has an estimated population of 278,456.

Sub-prefectures
The prefecture is divided administratively into 10 sub-prefectures:
 Macenta-Centre
 Balizia
 Binikala
 Bofossou
 Daro
 Fassankoni
 Kouankan
 Koyamah
 N'Zébéla
 Ourémai
 Panziazou
 Sengbédou
 Sérédou
 Vassérédou
 Watanka

Prefectures of Guinea
Nzérékoré Region